Anton Kinzel (born 9 January 1922) is an Austrian chess FIDE Master (FM) (1983), Austrian Chess Championship medalist (1958) and Clare Benedict Chess Cup winner (1961).

Biography
In the 1950s and 1960s, Anton Kinzel was one of the leading Austrian chess players. In 1951, he shared third place with Ernst Grünfeld behind Moshe Czerniak and Erik Lundin in the Carl Schlechter Memorial Tournament. In 1958, Anton Kinzel shared first place with Alexander Prameshuber in the Austrian Chess Championship but lost the additional match.

Anton Kinzel played for Austria in the Chess Olympiads:
 In 1956, at the third board in the 12th Chess Olympiad in Moscow (+4, =6, -3),
 In 1962, at the first reserve board in the 15th Chess Olympiad in Varna (+3, =2, -5),
 In 1966, at the second board in the 17th Chess Olympiad in Havana (+4, =7, -2),
 In 1968, at the first reserve board in the 18th Chess Olympiad in Lugano (+4, =7, -1),
 In 1970, at the third board in the 19th Chess Olympiad in Siegen (+0, =6, -2).

Anton Kinzel also participated in the Clare Benedict Chess Cup twelve times (1955, 1957, 1959, 1961-1965, 1967, 1969, 1974, 1977) and won one gold (1961) and four bronze (1955, 1957, 1959, 1964) medals in team competition and two gold (1961, 1964) medals in individual competition.

References

External links

Anton Kinzel chess games at 365chess.com

1922 births
Possibly living people
People from Horn, Austria
Austrian chess players
Chess FIDE Masters
Chess Olympiad competitors